Piletocera megaspilalis is a moth in the family Crambidae. It was described by George Hampson in 1897. It is found in the Bacan Islands of Indonesia.

References

megaspilalis
Moths described in 1897
Moths of Indonesia